Medgyes is a Hungarian surname, Hungarian name of Mediaș. Notable people with the surname include:

 Jozef Medgyes (born 1985), Slovak footballer
 Ladislas Medgyes (1892–?), Hungarian artist
 Péter Medgyes (born 1945), Hungarian professor
 Sinan Medgyes (born 1993), Slovak footballer
 Zoltán Medgyes (born 1995), Hungarian footballer

See also
 Medgyesi

Hungarian-language surnames